The government of Trinidad and Tobago was in the hands of a coalition called the People's Partnership, led by Kamla Persad-Bissessar, between May 2010 and September 2015.

Initial Cabinet

May 11, 2011- June 22, 2012

June 22, 2012 - September 7, 2015



Government of Trinidad and Tobago